The Neck Is a Bridge to the Body, is the Eighth full-length album by American guitarist Kaki King, released March 3, 2015. The album is the soundtrack to Kaki's projection mapping show of the same name.

"The Neck" Live Show
In 2014, Kaki collaborated with the visual experience company Glowing Pictures to construct an innovative, immersive multi-media production in which the guitar is used as a projection screen to tell a story. The hour-long production, entitled The Neck is a Bridge to the Body, places the focus on the guitar itself, the Instrument serving as an ontological tabula rasa in a creation myth unlike any other ever presented.

Glowing Pictures – known for their work with such artists as Animal Collective, David Byrne & Brian Eno, Beastie Boys, and TV On The Radio – collaborated with Kaki King  and have re-conceived The Guitar as a screen for a remarkable range of new digital projections. Protections of genesis and death, unexpected textures and skins, are cast onto an Ovation Adamas 1581-KK Kaki King's Signature 6-String Acoustic guitar customized specifically for the production.

“The Guitar is a shape-shifter,” King says, “something that plays all types of music and really fills all kinds of roles. It’s not always the six-string guitar that we all know and love. I’ve been playing guitar for more than 30 years. It’s who I am and if anything, this project has made me even more familiar with it.”

The Neck Is A Bridge To The Body debuted at Brooklyn’s acclaimed BRIC Theater in New York City in 2014, and will tour extensively in 2015.

Track listing

Personnel
Kaki King – Guitars and Drums
Dan Brantigan - Trumpet on "Anthropomorph"
ETHEL - String Quartet on Trying to Speak I and Trying to Speak II

Production
D. James Goodwin – producer

References

Kaki King albums
2015 albums